This is a list of Peterhead Football Club seasons from 1899 to 1999, when Peterhead joined the Aberdeenshire Football Association and Aberdeenshire League, to the present day. The list details Peterhead's record in league and cup competitions, and the club's top league goal scorer of each season. Top scorers in bold were also the top scorers in Peterhead's division that season. Records of competitions such as the Aberdeenshire Cup are not included.

The club was founded in 1891 and originally played in the Aberdeenshire League. In 2000 the club was elected to the Scottish Football League along with Elgin City F.C.

Seasons
This list is incomplete; you can help by adding missing items with reliable sources.

Key

 P = Played
 W = Games won
 D = Games drawn
 L = Games lost
 F = Goals for
 A = Goals against
 Pts = Points
 Pos = Final position

 R1 = Round 1
 R2 = Round 2
 R3 = Round 3
 R4 = Round 4
 QF = Quarter-finals
 SF = Semi-finals
 Aberdeenshire, North Eastern = Aberdeenshire and District League
 Highland = Highland Football League
 SFL 3 = Scottish Third Division
 SFL 2 = Scottish Second Division
 SL2 = Scottish League Two
 SL1 = Scottish League One

References

Seasons
 
Peterhead